Ephraim Zalman Margulies (sometimes transcribed as Margolis) (19 December 1762 – 24 August 1828) was a Galician rabbi born in Brody, brother of Chaim Mordechai Margulies.

Biography
He received his Talmudic education at different yeshivas, in which he distinguished himself for the acuteness of his intellect and for his astonishing memory. His correspondence with Ezekiel Landau and other leading Talmudists soon gained for him a high reputation. He established a banking-house which proved so successful that within a short time he became quite wealthy. In 1785 he published his responsa entitled Bet Hadash ha-Hadashot, and in the following year the rabbis of Brody elected him one of their number. Being of independent means, he opened in his house a yeshivah of which he was the head; several of his pupils became eminent rabbis.

Works
Margolis was considered a high rabbinical authority. He published the following works:
 Bet Efrayim (2 vols., Lemberg, 1809–10), commentary on parts of the Shulchan Arukh, Yoreh De'ah
 Oration at the funeral of Rabbi Meir Kristianopoler (ib. 1815)
 Bet Efrayim (4 parts, ib. 1818), responsa on the four parts of the Shulchan 'Arukh
 Yad Efrayim (Dubno, 1820), commentaries on Shulchan Arukh, Orach Chayim
 Sha'are Efrayim (ib. 1820), on the rules pertaining to the reading of the Law
 Yad Efrayim (Zolkiev, 1823), extensive commentaries on the names of men and of women to be employed in letters of divorce
 Shem Efrayim (Berdychev, 1826), commentary on the Torah
 Matteh Efrayim (Zolkiev, 1834), on the ritual laws to be observed from the beginning of the month of Elul until after the Feast of Tabernacles, as well as on the regulations regarding the Kaddish of orphans
 Zera' Efrayim (Lemberg, 1853), commentary on the Pesikta Rabbati

Many other works by him are still in manuscript (as of 1906).

References

1762 births
1828 deaths
People from Brody
Ukrainian Orthodox rabbis
19th-century rabbis from the Russian Empire
Orthodox rabbis from Galicia (Eastern Europe)
18th-century rabbis from the Russian Empire
Authors of books on Jewish law
Rosh yeshivas